Salchow  may refer to:

 Ulrich Salchow (1877–1949), Swedish figure skater
 Salchow jump, a figure skating jump named after him